V1 is a Paralympic archery classification for people with visual disabilities.

History
A version of this classification first appeared in 1998 during the world championships, when the sport's governing body decided to pilot a classification programme.  At the time, there was a classification called W2, which was for all standing archers with disabilities.

Sport
This is an archery classification for people with visual impairments.

Becoming classified
Classification is handled by FITA – International Archery Federation. World archery classification is done by at least three people.  One of them must have a medical background.  On the national level, there only needs to be one classifier. Archery classification is done by medical professionals.

See also

 Para-archery classification
 Archery at the Summer Paralympics

References

External links

 Paralympic Archery Classification Request 

Parasports classifications
Archery at the Summer Paralympics